There is no authoritative system of voice classification in non-classical music as classical terms are used to describe not merely various vocal ranges, but specific vocal timbres unique to each range. These timbres are produced by  classical training techniques with which most popular singers are not intimately familiar, and which even those that are do not universally employ them.

Overview
The term "non-classical music" is typically used to describe music in jazz, pop, blues, soul, country, folk, and rock styles. In the United States, the term contemporary commercial music (CCM) is used by some vocal pedagogues. Voice classification systems and vocal type terms were initially created for the purpose of classifying voices specifically within classical singing. As new styles of music developed, the quest for common terms for vocalists throughout these styles was sought, resulting in a loose application of the existing classical music practices. This approach has led to a system with many different names for the same term or style.

Approaches in classical music
There are two overall approaches within voice classification: one for opera vocalists and one for choral music parts. One of the major differences between these two in classifying voices is that choral music classifies voices entirely upon vocal range, whereas in opera classification systems many other factors are considered. Indeed, tessitura (where the voice feels most comfortable singing) and vocal timbre (the innate quality of sound to the voice) are more important factors than vocal range within opera categorization. Within opera there are several systems in use including the German Fach system, the Italian opera tradition, and French opera tradition.

All of these approaches to voice classification use some of the same terminology, which sometimes leads to confusion between the systems. In the operatic systems there are six basic voice types split between men and women, and each type then has several sub-types. These basic types are soprano, mezzo-soprano, and contralto for women, and tenor, baritone, and bass for men. Within choral music the system is collapsed into only four categories for adult singers: soprano and alto for women, and tenor and bass for men. In England, the term "male alto" is used to refer to a man who uses falsetto vocal production to sing in the alto section of a chorus. This practice is much less common outside of the UK where the term countertenor is more often applied. Countertenors are also widely employed within opera as solo vocalists. The term male alto is never used to refer to a solo vocalist. Children's voices, both male and female, are described as trebles, although the term boy soprano is widely used as well.

Application to non-classical singing 
In non-classical singing, it is difficult to place voices within either system for two major reasons. First, these voice categorizations were made with the understanding that the singer would be using classical vocal technique. These specific techniques, through study and training, result in a particular kind of vocal production and vocal timbre for each voice type which is unique to classical music. This is particularly problematic when trying to apply the operatic terms, as the vocal types are more descriptive of vocal timbre and vocal facility than simple vocal range. For example, one category of voice in opera is a contralto, which is the lowest female voice in the operatic system. One of the qualifying characteristics of this voice is a deep and dark quality to the vocal sound. This quality is not entirely innate to the voice, but is developed through classical vocal training. So although a singer in another genre might have a range equivalent to a contralto, they might not have a similar sound.

“These differences in voice qualities are reflections on variation in the muscular, aerodynamic, and acoustical conditions in the larynx and in the vocal tract. The subglottal pressure, the driving force in phonation, needs to be adapted in accordance with the laryngeal conditions.” In other words, the very act of singing consistently within one technique or another literally causes the voice to physically develop in different ways, and thus change the timbre of that particular voice.

Another example would be a coloratura soprano in opera. This is not only the highest female voice in opera, but also distinguished by its ability to do vocal acrobatic leaps, fast vocal runs and trills, and free movement within the highest part of the voice. A non-opera singer might be able to sing as high as a coloratura soprano, but might not be able to perform the vocal acrobatics of a coloratura soprano without classical technique and training. Therefore, the voice classification system in opera is not applicable to singers in other genres.

A second problem in applying these systems is a question of range specification. This is particularly a problem when trying to apply the choral music system to the non-classical singer. The choral system was developed to delineate polyphonic structure and was not really intended to designate a vocal type to individual singers. In other words, choral music was designed to be broken down into four vocal sections and it is the sections themselves that are labeled soprano, alto, tenor, and bass, not the individual singers. For example, most women that sing the alto line in choirs would be considered mezzo-sopranos in opera due to their vocal timbre and their particular range resting somewhere in the middle between a soprano and contralto. A small portion of them, however, would most likely be contraltos. Therefore, one could say, "I am a mezzo-soprano singing the alto line", and another could say "I am a contralto singing the alto line." They would have two different ranges and sounds but they would be singing the same part. This is important to understand because it means that choral music is not really about vocal type but about vocal range within a specific type of music: choral music.
It is not uncommon for men with higher voices to sing the alto line or women with lower voices to sing the tenor line. It is, however, improper for a man to call himself an alto or a soprano, or a woman a tenor or bass. A woman who sings the tenor line is really a contralto when applied to the classical vocal type system, and a man who sings alto or soprano a countertenor or sopranist.

That being said, non-classical singers can adopt some of the terms from both systems, but not all of them, when classifying their voices. The six-part structure of the operatic system is much preferable to the four-part choral system for non-classical singers because it has three sets of vocal ranges instead of two to choose from. Most people's voices fall within the middle categories of mezzo-soprano for women and baritone for men. There are also a fair number of tenors and sopranos, but true basses and contraltos are rare.

The sub-categories in opera, however, should never be applied to a non-classical singer, for they are too closely associated with classical vocal technique. Words like lyric, dramatic, coloratura, and other defining qualities should never be applied to a non-classical singer. Also specific kinds of voices like soubrette and spinto should not be used outside of classical singing. The main categories, however, can be, as long as they refer solely to range. A non-classical singer could use the chart that follows.

Vocal categories and ranges for classical singers
The ranges given below are approximations and are not meant to be too rigidly applied.

 Soprano: the highest female voice, being able to sing C (middle C) to C (high C), and possibly higher.
 Mezzo-soprano: a female voice between A (A below middle C) and A (two octaves above A). 
 Contralto: the lowest female voice, F (F below middle C) to E (two Es above middle C). Rare contraltos possess a range similar to the tenor. 
 Tenor: the highest male voice, B (2nd B below middle C) to A (A above Middle C), and possibly higher.
 Baritone: a male voice, G (two Gs below middle C) to F (F above middle C).
 Bass: the lowest male voice, E (two Es below middle C) to E (the E above middle C).

Some men, in falsetto voice or as a result of certain rare physiological conditions, can sing in the same range as women. These do not fall into the female categories, instead called countertenors within classical music. Within contemporary music, however, the use of the term tenor for these male voices would be more appropriate.

Vocal pedagogical methods for contemporary commercial music
Teaching voice within non-classical music is an emerging field. Up to this point, voice teachers and voice research have been largely concentrated with classical methods of singing. However, new approaches and methods to teaching non-classical voice have recently emerged, such as the complete vocal technique (CVT) by Cathrine Sadolin at Complete Vocal Institute or speech level singing (SLS) by Seth Riggs. Another example is Jeannette LoVetri's method known as somatic voicework. It has really only been within the last few years that music conservatories and music programs within universities have begun to embrace these alternative methodologies suitable to other kinds of vocal music. As an example, Dutch conservatories require all vocal teachers to have undergone CVT training, and all Danish conservatory vocal teaching covers the CVT method. Likewise, LoVetri teaches the somatic voicework method in the graduate vocal music department at Shenandoah University in the U.S.

See also
 Singers with a six-octave or greater vocal range
 Singers with a five-octave vocal range
 Singers with a four-octave vocal range
 Singers with a three-octave vocal range
 List of basses in non-classical music
 List of baritones in non-classical music
 List of tenors in non-classical music
 List of contraltos in non-classical music
 List of mezzo-sopranos in non-classical music
 List of sopranos in non-classical music
 Vocal register
 Voice type
 Fach

References

External links
 http://www.su.edu/conservatory/tvpc/index.cfm
 http://www.voicefoundation.org/
 http://www.thevoiceworkshop.com/
 http://www.speech.kth.se/prod/publications/files/3003.pdf

Singing
Voice types
Music classification